Tahnée Danyaela Seagrave (born 15 June 1995) is a British athlete, competing in the sport of downhill mountain biking.

She participated at the 2018 UCI Mountain Bike World Championships in round 5 held in Andorra, achieving a second place position on the podium. In 2020, Seagrave suffered injuries, including breaking several bones, before the start of the season and was not able to compete. She is sponsored by Red Bull, Fox, Canyon Bicycles, and others.

Personal life 
Seagrave was born in South London, but moved to St Jean d'Aulps , France with her parents at the age of eight. After seeing professional riders staying in her parents chalet, Seagrave became interested in mountain biking and started to compete.

Her brother, Kaos Seagrave, is also a mountain biker.

Seagrave currently lives in Wales.

Results

References

External links

1995 births
Living people
English female cyclists
Downhill mountain bikers
Cyclists from Greater London
English mountain bikers